The Philip D. Armour III House is a historic mansion in Lake Bluff, Illinois, USA. It was built for Philip D. Armour III, grandson of Armour and Company founder Philip D. Armour. It was designed in the Tudor Revival style by architect Harrie T. Lindeberg. It was listed on the National Register of Historic Places in 1996.

References

Houses on the National Register of Historic Places in Illinois
Tudor Revival architecture in the United States
Houses completed in 1932
Houses in Lake County, Illinois
National Register of Historic Places in Lake County, Illinois